HMS M2 may refer to the following ships of the Royal Navy:

  (1915), a monitor initially named M2
 , the second M-class submarine

See also
 , a Swedish Royal Navy M-type minesweeper; see List of mine warfare vessels of the Swedish Navy
 HSwMS Älvsborg (M02) (1969), a Swedish Royal Navy minelayer

Royal Navy ship names